Penymynydd is a small village in Flintshire, Wales, merging with the larger neighbouring village of Penyffordd. The name Penymynydd is Welsh, meaning "top" or "end of the mountain".

The village consists of a number of modern housing estates (Well House Drive, Coed Terfyn, Coed Y Graig), and also housing on Penymynydd Road (most of which is in Penyffordd).  Penymynydd has one church: St John The Baptist's Church. A second church formerly existed in the village and has since been redeveloped. St John The Baptist's Primary School is church aided and takes children between the ages of 3 and 11.

References

Villages in Flintshire